Kevin Roddy is an American professional mixed martial artist currently competing in Bellator's Featherweight division. A professional competitor since 2005, Roddy has also formerly competed for Strikeforce and M-1 Global.

Background
Born and raised in Bricktown, New Jersey, Roddy competed in soccer and hockey while growing up. Roddy began training in Brazilian jiu-jitsu in 2002 and later MMA in 2005.

Mixed martial arts career

Early career
Roddy made his professional MMA debut in 2005 and compiled a record of 15-14-1 with one no contest before signing with Bellator MMA. Roddy had also made it through the tryouts of Season Five of The Ultimate Fighter, but ultimately was not a part of the final cast.

Mixed martial arts record

|-
|Loss
|align=center|15–16–1 (1)
|Matt Bessette
|Submission (heel hook)
|Bellator 144
|
|align=center|1
|align=center|3:47
|Uncasville, Connecticut, United States
|
|-
| Win
| align=center| 15–15–1 (1)
| Trevor Suter
| Submission (armbar)
| CCFC 48: Good vs. Burrell
| 
| align=center| 1
| align=center| 1:28
| Atlantic City, New Jersey, United States
|
|- 
| Win
| align=center| 14–15–1 (1)
| Amran Aliyev
| Decision (unanimous)
| Bellator 118
| 
| align=center| 3
| align=center| 5:00
| Atlantic City, New Jersey, United States
| 
|-
| Loss
| align=center| 13–15–1 (1)
| Will Martinez
| Submission (rear-naked choke)
| Bellator 108
| 
| align=center| 1
| align=center| 3:50
| Atlantic City, New Jersey, United States
| 
|-
| Win
| align=center| 13–14–1 (1)
| Bryan Van Artsdalen
| Submission (armbar)
| Bellator 95
| 
| align=center| 2
| align=center| 1:04
| Atlantic City, New Jersey, United States
| 
|-
| Win
| align=center| 12–14–1 (1)
| Noe Quintanilla
| Submission (triangle choke)
| JBS Sports/Live Nation: Rock Out Knock Out
| 
| align=center| 1
| align=center| 1:53
| Asbury Park, New Jersey, United States
| 
|-
| Win
| align=center| 11–14–1 (1)
| Chris Simmons
| Decision (unanimous)
| Reality Fighting: Mohegan Sun
| 
| align=center| 3
| align=center| 5:00
| Uncasville, Connecticut, United States
| 
|-
| Loss
| align=center| 10–14–1 (1)
| Saul Almeida
| Decision (split)
| CES MMA: Undisputed
| 
| align=center| 3
| align=center| 5:00
| Lincoln, Rhode Island, United States
| 
|-
| Loss
| align=center| 10–13–1 (1)
| Chris Foster
| Decision (unanimous)
| UCC 4: Supremacy
| 
| align=center| 3
| align=center| 5:00
| Morristown, New Jersey, United States
| 
|-
| Loss
| align=center| 10–12–1 (1)
| Jason McLean
| Decision (split)
| Strikeforce: Fedor vs. Silva
| 
| align=center| 3
| align=center| 5:00
| East Rutherford, New Jersey, United States
| 
|-
| Loss
| align=center| 10–11–1 (1)
| Rafaello Oliveira
| Submission (rear-naked choke)
| DFL 1: The Big Bang
| 
| align=center| 1
| align=center| 4:46
| Atlantic City, New Jersey, United States
| 
|-
| Win
| align=center|  (1)
| Jonathan Chasse
| Submission (guillotine choke)
| GFL: Global Fight League 8
| 
| align=center| 1
| align=center| 2:24
| Dover, New Hampshire, United States
| 
|-
| Loss
| align=center| 9–10–1 (1)
| Dennis Bermudez
| Decision (unanimous)
| M-1 Selection 2010: The Americas Round 1
| 
| align=center| 3
| align=center| 5:00
| Atlantic City, New Jersey, United States
| 
|-
| Loss
| align=center| 9–9–1 (1)
| Freddy Assunção
| Decision (unanimous)
| RIE 2: Battle at the Burg 2
| 
| align=center| 3
| align=center| 5:00
| Penn Laird, Virginia, United States
| 
|-
| Draw
| align=center|9–8–1 (1)
| Marcos Rodrigues de Santos
| Draw (majority)
| WCA: Caged Combat
| 
| align=center| 3
| align=center| 5:00
| Atlantic City, New Jersey, United States
| 
|-
| Win
| align=center| 9–8 (1)
| Biff Walizer
| Submission (triangle choke)
| Extreme Challenge: Mayhem at the Marina
| 
| align=center| 2
| align=center| 3:19
| Atlantic City, New Jersey, United States
| 
|-
| Loss
| align=center| 8–8 (1)
| Jacob Kirwan
| Submission (guillotine choke)
| RIE 1: Battle at the Burg
| 
| align=center| 1
| align=center| 1:42
| Harrisonburg, Virginia, United States
| 
|-
| Loss
| align=center| 8–7 (1)
| Anthony Morrison
| Decision (unanimous)
| WCA: Pure Combat
| 
| align=center| 3
| align=center| 5:00
| Atlantic City, New Jersey, United States
| 
|-
| Win
| align=center| 8–6 (1)
| Peter Kalijevic
| Submission (armbar)
| Knockout Promotions: There Will Be Blood
| 
| align=center| 2
| align=center| 1:17
| Irving, New York, United States
| 
|-
| Loss
| align=center| 7–6 (1)
| Calvin Kattar
| KO (punches)
| CZ 26: The Rock
| 
| align=center| 1
| align=center| 0:47
| Salem, New Hampshire, United States
| 
|-
| Loss
| align=center| 7–5 (1)
| Dwayne Shelton
| Decision (split)
| BCX 5: Battle Cage Xtreme 5
| 
| align=center| 3
| align=center| 5:00
| Atlantic City, New Jersey, United States
| 
|-
| Loss
| align=center| 7–4 (1)
| Tim Troxell
| Decision (split)
| BCX 4: Battle Cage Xtreme 4
| 
| align=center| 1
| align=center| 0:58
| Atlantic City, New Jersey, United States
| 
|-
| Win
| align=center| 7–3 (1)
| Cory LaPlant
| Submission (armbar)
| BCX 2: Battle Cage Xtreme 2
| 
| align=center| 1
| align=center| 0:54
| Atlantic City, New Jersey, United States
| 
|-
| Loss
| align=center| 6–3 (1)
| Deividas Taurosevicius
| Submission (armbar)
| CCFC 5: Two Worlds, One Cage
| 
| align=center| 1
| align=center| 4:49
| Atlantic City, New Jersey, United States
| 
|-
| NC
| align=center| 6–2 (1)
| Jong Man Kim
| No Contest 
| Worlds Best Fighters: USA vs. Asia
| 
| align=center| 1
| align=center| 4:57
| Atlantic City, New Jersey, United States
| 
|-
| Loss
| align=center| 6–2
| Rich Boine
| KO (punch)
| ROC 12: Tournament of Champions Quarterfinals
| 
| align=center| 3
| align=center| 0:20
| Atlantic City, New Jersey
| 
|-
| Win
| align=center| 6–1
| Nick Sorg
| Submission (armbar)
| XG3: Xtreme Gladiators 3
| 
| align=center| 1
| align=center| N/A
| Richmond, Virginia, United States
| 
|-
| Win
| align=center| 5–1
| Darryl MarcAurele
| Submission (triangle choke)
| Reality Fighting: New Hampshire
| 
| align=center| 2
| align=center| N/A
| Manchester, New Hampshire, United States
| 
|-
| Win
| align=center| 4–1
| Al Buck
| Decision (unanimous)
| RF 12: Return to Boardwalk Hall
| 
| align=center| 3
| align=center| 3:00
| Atlantic City, New Jersey, United States
| 
|-
| Win
| align=center| 3–1
| Michael Murray
| Submission (armbar)
| SF 3: Beatdown
| 
| align=center| 1
| align=center| 1:10
| New Jersey, United States
| 
|-
| Loss
| align=center| 2–1
| Jim Miller
| Submission (rear-naked choke)
| RF 11: Battle at Taj Mahal
| 
| align=center| 1
| align=center| 1:31
| Atlantic City, New Jersey, United States
| 
|-
| Win
| align=center| 2–0
| Joseph Spataro
| Submission (arm-triangle choke)
| ROC: Ring of Combat 9
| 
| align=center| 2
| align=center| 2:21
| Asbury Park, New Jersey, United States
| 
|-
| Win
| align=center| 1–0
| Matt Perry
| Submission (armbar)
| MD 20: Mass Destruction 20
| 
| align=center| 1
| align=center| N/A
| Boston, Massachusetts, United States
|

References

Living people
American practitioners of Brazilian jiu-jitsu
People awarded a black belt in Brazilian jiu-jitsu
American male mixed martial artists
Featherweight mixed martial artists
Lightweight mixed martial artists
Mixed martial artists utilizing Brazilian jiu-jitsu
Year of birth missing (living people)
Mixed martial artists from New Jersey